William Russell Johnson (August 30, 1918 – June 20, 2006) was an American professional baseball player. He was a third baseman in Major League Baseball who played in 964 games for the New York Yankees in the 1940s and later with the St. Louis Cardinals.

He had an impressive rookie season which earned him 4th place in American League MVP voting. After missing 1944–1945 for wartime service in the United States Army, where he fought in the European Theater of Operations, he returned to MLB to spend the next five seasons as a regular third baseman. He served as the Cards' third baseman for two years before retiring during the  season.

In 964 games over nine seasons, Johnson posted a .271 batting average (882-for-3253) with 419 runs, 61 home runs, 487 RBI and 347 bases on balls. He finished his career with a .960 fielding percentage playing at third and first base. In 18 World Series games, he batted .237 (14-for-59) with 11 runs, 4 triples, 5 RBI and 3 walks.

In later years he worked as a shipping supervisor in Augusta, Georgia. He died there on June 20, 2006. He was the last surviving member of the 1943 World Champion New York Yankees.

References

External links

 
 
 

1918 births
2006 deaths
American League All-Stars
United States Army personnel of World War II
Augusta Tigers players
Baseball players from New Jersey
Binghamton Triplets players
Butler Yankees players
Columbus Red Birds players
Major League Baseball third basemen
Newark Bears (IL) players
New York Yankees players
Norfolk Tars players
People from Montclair, New Jersey
Sportspeople from Essex County, New Jersey
St. Louis Cardinals players